Konstpaus - samtliga inspelningar från 90-talet och lite till... is a compilation album from Swedish pop group Gyllene Tider, released on 17 July 2000.

Track listing
"Småstad" - 3:33
"Gå & fiska!" - 3:58
"Det är över nu" - 3:47
"Kung av sand" - 4:39
"Juni, juli, augusti" - 3:54
"Jo-Anna farväl" - 2:09
"Om hon visste vad hon ville" - 3:26
"Vandrande man" - 3:14
"Det är blommor som har fångat dig" - 4:52
"Faller ner på knä" - 3:39
"Ny pojkvän" - 2:03
"Oh Yeah Oh Yeah (Oh Oh)" - 2:22
"Harplinge" - 3:46
"Ingen går i ringen" - 2:29
"Solens vän" - 4:04

Charts

References

2000 compilation albums
Gyllene Tider compilation albums